Willie James Buchanon (born November 4, 1950) is an American former football player who was a cornerback for the Green Bay Packers and San Diego Chargers of the National Football League (NFL). He was defensive rookie of the year in 1972 and a two-time Pro Bowl player. He finished his career with his hometown San Diego Chargers, retiring with 28 career interceptions and 15 fumble recoveries.

Early years through college
Buchanon was born and raised in Oceanside, California, where he was a graduate of Oceanside High School. He attended Mira Costa College, where he was a Junior College All-American in 1969. Buchanon later played football and graduated from San Diego State University. He was voted the Most Valuable Player in the East-West Shrine Game of 1971. Sporting News named the San Diego State All-American to its All-Time collegiate team.

NFL career
Willie Buchanon was selected by Green Bay in the first-round of the 1972 NFL draft, the 7th overall pick. He was the 1972 NFL AP Defensive Rookie of the Year and a one-time All-Pro. In 1978, the Packers defensive back led the NFC with 9 interceptions, including four on September 24, 1978 against the San Diego Chargers that tied him for the still-standing NFL record for most interceptions in a game, first set by Sammy Baugh in 1943. Buchanon spent his last four pro years with the San Diego Chargers, where he tied the NFL all-time record for most recoveries in a game in 1981.

Awards and life after football
Buchanon was named to the Green Bay Packers All-Time team, Green Bay Packers Hall of Fame, San Diego State Hall of Fame, San Diego Hall of Champions, California State Junior College Hall of Fame and Oceanside High School Hall of Fame. He is now a realtor in San Diego.

Personal life
Buchanon and his wife, Gwen, have two children: a daughter, Jenae, and a son, Will. His son was a member of the 2003 and 2004 national championship teams with the University of Southern California Trojans, and later played in the NFL. Willie Buchanon lives in his hometown of Oceanside.

References

External links

Buchanon Realty official site

1950 births
Living people
American football cornerbacks
Green Bay Packers players
National Conference Pro Bowl players
National Football League Defensive Rookie of the Year Award winners
Players of American football from San Diego
San Diego Chargers players
San Diego State Aztecs football players
Sportspeople from Oceanside, California